Julie Taton (born 6 February 1984), is a Belgian television and radio presenter and a former beauty pageant title-holder.

Biography 
Taton was born in  Namur, Belgium in 1984. In 2003, when she was 18 years old, she won the title of Miss Belgium. She represented her country at Miss Universe 2003, Miss Europe 2003, and Miss World 2003.

After her reign as Miss Belgium came to an end, she joined RTL-TVI in Belgium as an announcer. She also presented a live morning show on Radio Contact, also in Belgium.

In 2009, Taton presented the Belgian version of L'Amour est dans le pré. In 2011, she presented the talent show series Belgium's Got Talent and the French reality show Secret Story. In 2009 and 2016, Taton was a participant in the French game show Fort Boyard.

Taton is an ambassador for the Red Cross in Belgium and supporter of Think Pink, an association for breast cancer survivors.

References

1984 births
Belgian beauty pageant winners
Belgian television presenters
Belgian women television presenters
Belgian radio presenters
Belgian women radio presenters
Living people
Miss Universe 2003 contestants
Miss World 2003 delegates
People from Namur (city)
Walloon people
Miss Belgium winners